Memories is the ninth studio album by Japanese group Garnet Crow. The album was released on December 7, 2011, by Giza Studio.

Background
The album consist of two previously released singles, Smiley Nation and Misty Mystery.

B-side track Live from single Misty Mystery get new album arrangement under subtitle When You Are Near!.

This is their last album where a theme song from Anime television series Detective Conan was included.

Commercial performance 
The album reached #11 rank in Oricon for first week. It charted for 7 weeks and sold 13,798 copies.

Track listing 
All tracks are composed by Yuri Nakamura, written by Nana Azuki and arranged by Hirohito Furui.

Usage in media
Smiley Nation was used as ending theme in Nippon TV program Futtonda
Misty Mystery was used as opening theme for anime Detective Conan
Live 〜When You Are Near!〜 was used as theme song in TV Asahi program Go tou chiken Emi TV Sore tte Kininaruu~

References 

2011 albums
Being Inc. albums
Giza Studio albums
Japanese-language albums
Garnet Crow albums